Crazy Bus is an unlicensed 2004 Venezuelan bus driving video game originally started as a programming experiment that eventually was included in ROM collection tools, after which its popularity increased. Its gameplay simply consists in driving a bus forward and backward to accumulate points, allowing to choose between five buses of Brazilian, Venezuelan and Spanish brands. Crazy Bus has been critically panned for its music, described as being "chaotic".

References

External links 
 
 CrazyBus (Sega Genesis) Angry Video Game Nerd (AVGN) -YouTube

2004 video games
Bus simulation video games
Sega Genesis games
Video games developed in Venezuela
Unauthorized video games
Single-player video games
Sega Genesis-only games